"New York Mining Disaster 1941" was released on Spin Records by the Bee Gees in 1967. It was their second EP and, like their first EP, was released only in Australia. All of the songs on this EP were originally released on their third LP Bee Gees' 1st.

Track listing
All songs written and composed by Robin Gibb and Barry Gibb.

Side One
 "New York Mining Disaster 1941" – 2:09
 "I Can't See Nobody" – 3:45

Side Two
 "Turn of the Century" – 2:25
 "Holiday" – 2:53

Personnel
 Robin Gibb – pump organ, lead vocals on "I Can't See Nobody" and "New York Mining Disaster 1941", backing vocals
 Barry Gibb – rhythm guitar, lead vocals on "Turn of the Century" and "Holiday", backing vocals
 Maurice Gibb – bass, rhythm guitar, piano, Hammond organ, harpsichord, mellotron, backing vocals
 Vince Melouney – lead guitar
 Colin Petersen – drums
 Phil Dennys – orchestral arrangement on "New York Mining Disaster 1941"
 Bill Shepherd – orchestral arrangement
 Mike Claydon – engineer

References

1967 EPs
Bee Gees EPs
Albums recorded at IBC Studios